Closed Casket is the fourth studio album by Esham, released on November 22, 1994, and distributed by Reel Life Productions/Warlock Records.

Lyrics and music 

Because of the Satanic themes of his earlier work,  Esham had been accused of Satanism. Feeling that the lyrical content of his albums was being taken too seriously,  Esham decided that after producing one final album with such material, he would no longer rap about the Devil.

Jason Birchmeier noted that "the production improves upon past albums, not as reliant on samples and obviously more crafted".

Reception 

Allmusic wrote "most fans taking a chronological approach to his catalog should be fairly numb to Esham's exploitative shock attempts. Yet if this is one of your first experiences with Esham the Unholy, this album should pack a punch with its dark nature."

Track listing

Personnel
Esham - Performer
TNT - Guest Performer
Mastamind - Guest Performer
Producer: Esham
Executive Producer: James H. Smith
Engineer: Esham
Mastering: Esham
Programming: Esham

References

1994 albums
Albums produced by Esham
Esham albums
Reel Life Productions albums
Warlock Records albums